Voivodeship Road 115 (abbreviated DW 115) is a route in the Polish voivodeship roads network. On 5 June 2008 the route allowed access with Germany by the border crossing Dobieszczyn - Hintersee and the route was added 900 metres to be able to join with the border.

Important settlements along the route

Szczecin
Tanowo
Dobieszczyn

Route plan

References

115